Dunston Pillar is a Grade II listed stone tower in Lincolnshire, England and a former 'land lighthouse'.

History 
The original land lighthouse was commissioned by Sir Francis Dashwood (better known as the founder of the Knights of St Francis, which became the Monks of Medmenham, later called a Hellfire Club) in 1751 as a gift to his wife Sarah (Ellys) Dashwood, who feared crossing the dark heath near her childhood home, Nocton. The purpose of the land lighthouse was to improve the safety of 18th-century travellers crossing a particularly treacherous area of the county known for its many incidents of robbery  by highwaymen. In the 1843 Journal of the Agricultural Society it was described as the "only land light-house ever raised".

The lantern was regularly lit until 1788 and was used for the last time in 1808 by which time improvements in the local road network had made it effectively obsolete.

Sir Francis landscaped the base of Dunston Tower with a plantation of trees and a bowling green. It became a popular gathering place for picnics, tea parties, quoits and cards. A two-storey dining hall was later added. The vicar of Welbourn called it "the Vauxhall" of Lincolnshire, and the Lincoln Club was formed to arrange entertainments there.

In 1808, the lantern was destroyed in a storm and was replaced in 1810 by the 4th Earl of Buckinghamshire, in celebration of fifty years of the king's reign, with a  Coade stone (lithodipyra) statue of King George III sculpted by Joseph Panzetta for Eleanor Coade.

At this time the oversize statue of George III was removed and broken up; the surviving bust can be seen in the grounds of Lincoln Castle. The statue is a listed building in its own right.

See also
Pelham's Pillar
Grimsby Dock Tower

References

External links
Local village website
Lincolnshire Heritage website
Local author's description

Monuments and memorials in Lincolnshire
Monumental columns in the United Kingdom
Grade II listed buildings in Lincolnshire
North Kesteven District
Grade II listed lighthouses
1751 establishments in England